The 1952 Navy Midshipmen football team represented the United States Naval Academy (USNA) as an independent during the 1952 college football season. The team was led by third-year head coach Eddie Erdelatz. They were invited to the 1953 Orange Bowl but refused the bid.

Schedule

Personnel

References

Navy
Navy Midshipmen football seasons
Navy Midshipmen football